Events in the year 1937 in Bulgaria.

Incumbents 
Monarch – Boris III

Events 

 The Vakarel radio transmitter near Vakarel, Bulgaria was inaugurated.

References 

 
1930s in Bulgaria
Years of the 20th century in Bulgaria
Bulgaria
Bulgaria